The George Carter Whitmore Mansion is a historic house in Nephi, Utah. It was built in 1898 for George Carter Whitmore, who founded the First National Bank of Nephi and served as a Democratic member of the Utah Senate from  1900 to 1908. The house was designed in the Queen Anne and Eastlake styles by architect Oscar Booth. Whitmore, his wife née Mary Elizabeth Hague, and their eight children, lived here until his death in 1917. It was inherited by one of his sons, George M. Whitmore. It has been listed on the National Register of Historic Places since December 12, 1978.

References

National Register of Historic Places in Juab County, Utah
Queen Anne architecture in Utah
Houses completed in 1898
1898 establishments in Utah